Brown Station (or more often Base Brown or Estación Brown) is an Argentine Antarctic base and scientific research station named after Admiral William Brown, the father of the Argentine Navy. It is located on Sanavirón Peninsula along Paradise Harbor, Danco Coast, in Graham Land, Antarctic Peninsula.

 Brown is one of 13 research bases in Antarctica operated by Argentina. 
From 1951 to 1984 it served as a permanent base; since then it is open during the summer season only.

History
Brown Station dates to 6 April 1951, when Argentina established the Almirante Brown Naval Detachment at Paradise Harbor.

The Argentine Antarctic Institute took over the station in 1964–65, creating one of the most complete biology laboratories on the Antarctic Peninsula. It was called Almirante Brown Research Station and inaugurated on 17 February 1965.

Brown Station's original facilities were burned down by the station's doctor on 12 April 1984 after he was ordered to stay for the winter. Station personnel were rescued by the ship USS Hero and taken to United States’s Palmer Station.

Argentina rebuilt the base but it was demoted to summer-only status. During the summer campaign of 1995–96 the Logistics Department of the Argentine National Antarctic Directorate built two new habitable modules: a laboratory and a house with amenities. In the 1999–2000 campaign the Directorate built a new main house capable of comfortably accommodating 8 people; the new building consists of 4 bedrooms, kitchen and 2 bathrooms.

Brown slipped into several years of inactivity during the 2000s decade but since 2007 is occupied during the summer again.

Conscripto Ortiz Refuge 

Refuge Conscripto Ortiz is an Argentine refuge in Antarctica located 230 meters from the Brown Station. The refuge was opened on January 29, 1956, and it is administered by the Argentine Navy. 
His name pays homage to the conscript Mario Inocencio Ortíz who died, on March 15, during the Argentine Antarctic campaign of 1954–1955 in service aboard the transport ship ARA Bahía Aguirre.
The detachment worked as a meteorological observatory and as a base for Antarctic campaigns until it was temporarily closed in 1960.

Description
Paradise Harbor is a large sea inlet southwest of Andvord Bay protected by an arc formed by the Lemaire, Cramer and Bryde islands.

In the area there are several beacons to help ship guidance: Punta Proa, in the homonymous place; Punta Vidt in General Ricchieri Cove; Punta Conesa, on the entrance to Puerto Leith; Hanka islet on the homonymous place in Paradise Harbor; Punta Piedras in Oscar Cove; and the lighthouse on Cramer Island.

It can house a maximum of 12 people.

Scientific activities
Research programs were developed for biology (zoology and botany), bacteriology, limnology, biochemistry, animal and human physiology, pathology, ecology, oceanography, meteorology, cosmic rays and ionospheric observations, environmental nuclear radiation, continental and sea ice glaciology, satellite geodesy, geology, geophysics, seismology, ozone monitoring and tide measurement. Throughout the years of research and observations at Brown, more than 100 scientific papers were published by the Argentine Antarctic Institute.

Tourism
Thanks to its location on the Antarctica continent along the beautiful Paradise Harbor and to its relatively mild weather, Brown Station is a popular excursion destination for tourist expedition ships visiting Antarctica. Rather than walking down the steep slope, many visitors use the human bobsled course. All those visitors sledding downhill have created a ditch a few feet deep that makes for excellent sledding.

Climate
Weather in the area is relatively mild, the nearby mountains shelter the bay from strong winds.

See also
 Almirante Ice Fringe
 Argentine Antarctica
 List of Antarctic research stations
 List of Antarctic field camps

References

Citations

Articles
 

Books

External links

 Fundaciòn Marambio – Base Brown 
 Dirección Nacional del Antártico

bmc

Brown
Populated places established in 1951
Outposts of Graham Land
Danco Coast
1951 establishments in Antarctica